Jaihe Township is a township in Jiangcheng Hani and Yi Autonomous County, Yunnan, China.

Etymology
In Hani language, "Jiahe" means a place of hope and harvest.

Administrative division
As of 2016, the township is divided into ten villages: 
Jiangxi
 Lianhe
 Lixian
 Baga
 Pingzhang
 Mingzishan
 Luosa
 Gejie
 Nanwang
 Zhonghui

Geography
It lies at the northern of Jiangcheng Hani and Yi Autonomous County, bordering Baozang Town to the west, Guoqing Township to the south, Mojiang Hani Autonomous County and Lüchun County to the north, and Qushui Town to the east.

The Lixian River and Duo Stream flow through the township.

Economy
The principal industries in the area are agriculture and animal husbandry. Tea, sugarcane, and natural rubber are cash crops of the township.

Demographics

As of 2017, the National Bureau of Statistics of China estimates the township's population now to be 14,727.

Transportation
The township is connected to two highways: the National Highway G227 and the Provincial Highway S214.

References

Bibliography

Divisions of Jiangcheng Hani and Yi Autonomous County